Trzebicz may refer to:

Trzebicz, Lubusz Voivodeship
Trzebicz, West Pomeranian Voivodeship
Trzebicz-Młyn
Trzebicz Nowy

See also 
Třebíč
Trebitsch
Trzebież